Antony House is the name of an early 18th-century house, which today is in the ownership of the National Trust. It is located between the town of Torpoint and the village of Antony in the county of Cornwall, England, United Kingdom. It is a Grade I listed building.

The house is faced in silvery-grey Pentewan stone, flanked by colonnaded wings of mellow brick and overlooks the River Lynher. It was built for Sir William Carew, 5th Baronet between 1718 and 1724, and ever since has continued as the primary residence of the Carew family, who have owned the estate since the mid-16th century. Sir John Carew Pole gave the house and formal gardens into the care of the National Trust in 1961, on the understanding that the family could continue to reside there. Currently Tremayne Carew Pole lives there with his family.

The house and gardens are open to viewing by the public between March and October.

Collections and furnishings

Antony House hosts a splendid collection of portraits, including a portrait of Charles I of England at his trial, (Charles I granted a baronetcy to the Poles in 1628). The collection contains some of Sir Joshua Reynolds' works, and a portrait of Rachel Carew, believed to have inspired Daphne du Maurier's novel My Cousin Rachel.

Rooms are heavily panelled in Dutch Oak and contain fine collections of 18th-century furnishings and textiles.

Gardens and estate
The grounds were landscaped by Georgian garden designer Humphry Repton and include the formal garden with the "National Collection of Day Lilies". In the early 19th century, yew hedges and topiary were added to the formal landscaping. Adorning the gardens are stone carvings from North West India, a Burmese temple bell brought to Antony by General Sir Reginald Pole Carew, statuary and more recently acquired modern sculptures, including the Antony Cone water sculpture by William Pye. This echoes the grand spectacle of the topiary yew cone nearby, which is almost as tall as the house itself. Other sculptures include Jupiter Stone by Peter Randall-Page and Hypercone by Simon Thomas.

Other notable features include a black walnut tree, cork tree, a Japanese ornamental pond and knot garden. The dovecote dates from the 18th century, while a folly has been added recently in the estate grounds.

The surrounding woodland garden (not National Trust, but owned by the Carew Pole Garden Trust) is noted for rhododendrons, azaleas, camellias and magnolias, and surrounding woods provide delightful walks, which extend down to the river Lynher. The Bath Pond House situated in the woodland walks was built in 1789.

Film location
Filming for the 2010 Disney film production of Alice in Wonderland, directed by Tim Burton, took place in the grounds of Antony House in September 2008. The estate was also used as a location for a Rosamunde Pilcher TV movie by German company ZDF with director Dieter Kehler.

References

External links

Antony information at the National Trust
GENUKI page

Grade I listed buildings in Cornwall
National Trust properties in Cornwall
Historic house museums in Cornwall
Gardens in Cornwall
Houses completed in 1721
Country houses in Cornwall
Grade I listed houses
1721 establishments in England
Grade II* listed parks and gardens in Cornwall
Woodland gardens
Gardens by Humphry Repton

kw:Trevanta